Makian (also Machian), known to local people as Mount Kie Besi, is a volcanic island, one of the Maluku Islands within the province of North Maluku in Indonesia. It lies near the southern end of a chain of volcanic islands off the western coast of the province's major island, Halmahera, and lies between the islands of Moti and Tidore to the north and Kayoa and the Bacan Group to the south. The island, which forms two districts (Pulau Makian and Makian Barat) within South Halmahera Regency of North Maluku Province, covers an area of 84.36 sq.km, and had a population of 12,394 at the 2010 Census, which rose to 14,000 at the 2020 Census.

There are four parasitic cones on the western slopes of Makian. Makian volcano is also known as Mount Kiebesi (or Kie Besi).

Volcanic history
Makian volcano has had infrequent, but violent eruptions that destroyed villages on the island.

Its first recorded eruption was in the 1550s. The eruptions of July 19, 1646, September 22, 1760 and December 28, 1861 are rated 4 on the Volcanic Explosivity Index. Since the first known eruption in the 1550s, it has erupted seven times, four of which caused fatalities.

The 1760 eruption of the volcano killed about three thousand inhabitants. It erupted in 1890, and was then dormant until July 1988, when a series of eruptions forced the temporary evacuation of the island's entire population, then about fifteen thousand people.

Languages 
There are 2 unrelated languages spoken in this island, Taba and West Makian languages. Taba or East Makian belongs to the Austronesian language family, while West Makian belongs to the West Papuan language family.

See also 
 List of volcanoes in Indonesia

References

External links

 Makian As It Appears from the Side of Ngofakiaha from 1670

Islands of the Maluku Islands
18th-century volcanic events